Liar's Dice is a 2013 Indian Hindi-language road movie written and directed by Geetu Mohandas and starring Geetanjali Thapa and Nawazuddin Siddiqui. The film tells the story of a young mother from a remote village who, going in search of her missing husband, goes missing herself. The film examines the human cost of migration to cities and the exploitation of migrant workers.

The production is Mohandas' feature film debut; she had previously made the short film Kelkkunndo in 2008, which received wide acclaim. Liar's Dice had its world premiere at the Mumbai Film Festival in October 2013, where it took part in the Indian competition section. In January 2014, the film was screened at the Sundance Film Festival and the International Film Festival Rotterdam. It won a special jury award at the Sofia International Film Festival.

Liar's Dice  went on to receive two awards at the 61st National Film Awards: Best Actress for Geetanjali Thapa, and Best Cinematography for Rajeev Ravi. The film was India's official entry at the 87th Academy Awards for Best Foreign Language Film, but was not nominated.  Art director Ajay Sharma, who had worked on movies such as Happy Journey (2014), won the Best Art Director Award at the Maharashtra State Film Awards.

Plot
The canvas of the film stretches from a small village in the mountains called Chitkul on the border with China, to the big city of Delhi. Kamala, a young mother from a tribal community, her three-year-old daughter, and her daughter's pet goat, embark on a journey to find her husband who has been missing for the last five months. Along the way, they meet an army deserter, Nawazuddin, who accompanies them. They travel together until they reach the house of Kamala's husband's boss, but he is away. Kamala and Nawazuddin quarrel and part ways. Kamala decides to go to Delhi to search for her husband, and she runs into Nawazuddin at the train station. He decides to accompany her and her daughter once more, in order to keep them safe. They arrive in Delhi together and a series of mishaps ensues. Kamala keeps trying to call her husband's phone and finally hears a ringtone. The ringing appears to be coming from Nawazuddin's bag, however. Kamala opens the bag and finds her husband's wallet, his watch, and his belongings.
At the end of the film, Nawazuddin is seen working in construction and Kamala is back in her village.

Cast
 Nawazuddin Siddiqui as Nawazuddin
 Geetanjali Thapa as Kamala
 Manya Gupta as Manya
 Vikram Bhagra as Hotel owner
 Murari Kumar as Hotel boy

Production
Director Geetu Mohandas is a noted actress in Malayalam cinema. She wrote the script to the film in 2007, before her debut short Kelkkunndo (Are You Listening) in 2008. However, she was unable to get the film financed due to the unusual storyline and a relatively unknown cast. Nevertheless, after the critical success received at the International Film Festival Rotterdam (IFFR) for her short film, she managed to get a project development grant of €10,000 (around Rs.8.45 lakh now) from the IFFR's Hubert Bals Fund.

The film faced difficulties in raising funds before Alan McAlex and Ajay G. Rai, producers from Jar Pictures,  stepped in. The final project was co-produced with Mohandas' own production company, Unplugged.

Liar's Dice was shot on a low budget using a small crew in under a month in March 2012. It was filmed on location in the village of Chitkul in Kinnaur district, Shimla, and various locations in Delhi, including the Jama Masjid. The cinematography was done by Mohandas' husband, Rajeev Ravi, who had previously worked on movies such as Dev.D (2009) and Gangs of Wasseypur (2012).

Reception
Variety called the film a "quietly effective debut".

Awards
61st National Film Awards
National Film Award for Best Actress - Geetanjali Thapa
National Film Award for Best Cinematography - Rajeev Ravi
Sofia International Film Festival, 2014 
Won Special Jury Award
NYIFF 2014
Won Best Actress
Won Best Film Award in international competition
Pesaro International Film Festival, 2014
Won Lino Micciche Award for Best Film
 Granada Cines del Sur Film Festival
Won Bronce Alhambra award

See also
 List of submissions to the 87th Academy Awards for Best Foreign Language Film
 List of Indian submissions for the Academy Award for Best Foreign Language Film
 Liar's dice

References

External links
 

2013 films
2010s Hindi-language films
Films set in Himachal Pradesh
Films shot in Himachal Pradesh
Films set in Delhi
Films shot in Delhi
Films featuring a Best Actress National Award-winning performance
2010s drama road movies
Indian drama road movies
Films set in Gurugram
Films whose cinematographer won the Best Cinematography National Film Award
Works about human migration
Films about human trafficking in India
2013 directorial debut films
2013 drama films
Films shot in Gurugram